Charles J. Richman (January 12, 1865 – December 1, 1940) was an American stage and film actor who appeared in more than 60 films between 1914 and 1939. 

Richman was born in the Kenwood Section of Chicago, Illinois. After receiving a public-school education, he attended the Chicago College of Law at night. His interest turned from law to theater after he began acting in amateur productions at the Carleton Club and a millionaire offered to sponsor a touring company headed by Richman. That project led Richman to New York.

Long before entering films Richman acted in the legitimate theatre. His work on Broadway began with portraying Horst von Neuhoff in The Countess Gucki (1896) and ended with playing Grandfather Trenchard in And Stars Remain (1936). In Hollywood, he often played supporting roles as a dignified authoritarian figures like General Tufto in the first Technicolor film Becky Sharp (1935) and Judge Thatcher in The Adventures of Tom Sawyer (1938).

Richman was married to the former Jane Grey for 40 years. They had a son and a daughter.

On December 1, 1940, Richman died in the Brady Nursing Home in The Bronx, New York, aged 70.

Partial filmography

The Man From Home (1914) as Daniel Voorhees Pike
The Idler (1914) as Mark Cross
The Battle Cry of Peace (1915) as John Harrison
The Heights of Hazard (1915) as Billy Williams
 The Surprises of an Empty Hotel (1916) as Francis Trehurn Marchmont
The Hero of Submarine D-2 (1916) as Lt. Commander Colton
The Dawn of Freedom (1916) as Richard Cartwright
The Secret Kingdom (1916) as Prince Philip / Phil Barr
The More Excellent Way (1917) as John Warburton
 Public Be Damned (1917) as John Black
 Over There (1917) as Montgomery Jackson
The Hidden Truth (1919) as Charles Taylor
The Echo of Youth (1919) as Peter Graham
 Everybody's Business (1919) as Tom Oakes
Harriet and the Piper (1920) as Richard Carter
Half an Hour (1920) as Richard Garson
Curtain (1920) as Dick Cunningham
Trust Your Wife (1921)
The Sign on the Door (1921) as 'Lafe' Regan
My Friend the Devil (1922) as George Dryden
Has the World Gone Mad! (1923) as Mr. Bell
The College Hero (1927) as The Dean (uncredited)
The Struggle (1931) as Mr. Craig
Take a Chance (1933) as Andrew Raleigh
His Double Life (1933) as Witt
The President Vanishes (1934) as Judge Corcoran
Biography of a Bachelor Girl (1935) as Mr. Orrin Kinnicott
After Office Hours (1935) as Jordan
George White's 1935 Scandals (1935) as Charlie Harriman (uncredited)
The Case of the Curious Bride (1935) as C. Phillip Montaine
Becky Sharp (1935) as Gen. Tufto
The Glass Key (1935) as Senator John T. Henry
Thanks a Million (1935) as Gov. Wildman (uncredited)
In Old Kentucky (1935) as Pole Shattuck
Strike Me Pink (1936) as Professor (uncredited)
My Marriage (1936) as H.J. Barton
Champagne Charlie (1936) as Avory (uncredited)
The Ex-Mrs. Bradford (1936) as Mr. Curtis, Turf Club President (uncredited)
Parole! (1936) as John 'Jack' Driscoll
I'd Give My Life (1936) as Attorney Bill Chase
Don't Turn 'Em Loose (1936) as Paul, the Governor (uncredited)
In His Steps (1936) as Robert Brewster
Under Your Spell (1936) as Uncle Bob
Sing Me a Love Song (1936) as Mr. Malcolm (uncredited)
Stella Dallas (1937) as Stephen Dallas Sr., Suicide Victim (uncredited)
The Life of Emile Zola (1937) as M. Delagorgue
Make a Wish (1937) as Wagner
Fit for a King (1937) as Reception Guest (uncredited)
Nothing Sacred (1937) as Mayor (uncredited)
Lady Behave! (1937) as Howell
Blondes at Work (1938) as Judge Wilson
The Adventures of Tom Sawyer (1938) as Judge Thatcher
Holiday (1938) as Thayer (uncredited)
Personal Secretary (1938) as Judge Barnes (uncredited)
The Cowboy and the Lady (1938) as Dillon
Devil's Island (1939) as Governor Beaufort
The Man Who Dared (1939) as Mayor Lawton (uncredited)
Dark Victory (1939) as Colonel Mantle
Torchy Runs for Mayor (1939) as Mayor John Saunders
Exile Express (1939) as Judge (uncredited)

References

External links

1865 births
1940 deaths
Burials at Ferncliff Cemetery
American male silent film actors
Male actors from Chicago
20th-century American male actors